In Japan during the 1970s, the economy was hit by the oil shock and the Nixon shock. Energy consumption dropped and industrial production increased. During the 1970s energy crisis, Japan introduced energy-saving measures and became a hub of miniaturization. The women's liberation movement in Japan, known as ũman ribu, began to gain momentum with feminist groups starting to form in 1970.

In November 1973, a tissue shortage in Japan was reported by news agencies.

References

See also
 Don Maloney (author)